Crestonio, Texas is a ghost town in Duval County, Texas, twenty miles southwest of Benavides.  The community stopped appearing on maps in the 1970s.

References

Ghost towns in South Texas
Geography of Duval County, Texas